Janice Weiner (born  1958) is an American politician and member of the Iowa Senate representing the 45th District.

Early life and career
Weiner was born in   1958, and raised in Coralville, Iowa. After graduating from Iowa City West High School, followed by Princeton University in 1980, and Stanford Law School in 1984, she worked for 26 years in the United States Foreign Service. Upon retirement, she returned to Coralville, working as a substitute teacher in 2015 and 2016.

Political career
Weiner first ran for public office in 2016, but did not win the Iowa City Community School Board seat vacated by Tom Yates. She then ran for an open seat in District 37 of the Iowa Senate in 2018, losing a Democratic Party primary to Zach Wahls. Weiner was elected to an at-large seat on the Iowa City city council in 2019. She began campaigning for the state senate seat in District 45 in November 2021. Due to redistricting, incumbent state senator Joe Bolkcom was eligible to represent this seat, but had previously announced his retirement. Weiner defeated John Raley in the Democratic Party primary in June 2022, and won the general election against Republican candidate Harold Weilbrenner. After winning the Iowa Senate election for District 45, Weiner resigned her seat on the Iowa City city council on 9 November 2022. After the resignation becomes effective on 31 December 2022, a successor will be appointed in January 2023.

References

Living people
Women state legislators in Iowa
1950s births
American women diplomats
21st-century American diplomats
20th-century American diplomats
Iowa Democrats
Stanford Law School alumni
Princeton University alumni
21st-century American women politicians
21st-century American politicians
Women city councillors in Iowa
Iowa city council members
Politicians from Iowa City, Iowa